Sydney is an unincorporated community in Hillsborough County, Florida, United States. Sydney has a post office with ZIP code 33587.

References

Unincorporated communities in Hillsborough County, Florida
Unincorporated communities in Florida